The 1973 FA Charity Shield was contested between Burnley and Manchester City in a fixture that took place at Maine Road. For the third consecutive year, neither the reigning Division One champions (Liverpool) nor the reigning FA Cup holders (Sunderland) chose to compete; instead, Burnley, the reigning Second Division champions, were invited to play Manchester City, the reigning holders of the Shield 

Burnley won the match 1–0 thanks to a goal from defender Colin Waldron.

Match details

References

1973
Charity Shield 1973
Charity Shield 1973
Comm
FA Charity Shield